Shiringa (Sherenge) is a rural locality (a settlement) in Yeravninsky District, Republic of Buryatia, Russia. The population was 579 as of 2010. There are 67 streets.

Geography 
Shiringa is located 22 km northeast of Sosnovo-Ozerskoye (the district's administrative centre) by road, by the shore of the Maly Yeravna lake, part of the Yeravna-Khorga Lake System. Tuldun is the nearest rural locality.

References 

Rural localities in Yeravninsky District